Darestan, the Kurdish word for forest, may refer to the following places in Iran:

 Darestan, Gilan
 Darestan, Ravar, Kerman Province
 Darestan, Sirjan, Kerman Province
 Darestan-e Bala, Kerman Province
 Darestan, Markazi
 Darestan, Yazd